Xavien Howard (born July 4, 1993) is an American football cornerback for the Miami Dolphins of the National Football League (NFL). He played college football at Baylor and was drafted in the second round of the 2016 NFL Draft by the Dolphins.

Early years
Howard was born on July 4, 1993 and grew up in the Fifth Ward area of Houston, Texas. He attended and played football at Wheatley High School in the city, where he was teammates with fellow NFL cornerback William Jackson III. He committed to Baylor University to play college football.

College career
Howard played at Baylor from 2012 to 2015. During his career, he had 98 tackles, 10 interceptions 1.5 sacks, and one touchdown. After his junior year, he declared for the 2016 NFL Draft.

Statistics

Professional career
Howard attended the 2016 NFL Scouting Combine in Indianapolis, Indiana. He completed all of the combine drills and finished tied for 12th among defensive backs in the short shuttle. He also attended Baylor's pro day. Howard opted to redo the majority of workouts and improved on all his combine numbers with scouts and representatives from all 32 NFL teams looking on, including head coaches Mike Tomlin (Steelers) and Bill O'Brien (Texans). Prior to the draft, Howard was projected to be a second or third-round pick.

The Miami Dolphins selected Howard in the second round with the 38th overall pick in the 2016 NFL Draft. In order to draft Howard, the Miami Dolphins traded their second-round pick (42nd overall) and fourth-round pick (107th overall) in the 2016 NFL Draft to the Baltimore Ravens in exchange for their second-round pick (38th overall). Howard was the sixth cornerback selected in 2016.

2016
On May 18, 2016, the Miami Dolphins signed Howard to a four-year, 6.12 million contract with $3.83 million guaranteed and a signing bonus of $2.65 million.

During organized team activities and minicamp, Howard competed for job as the No. 2 starting cornerback against Tony Lippett. On the final day of minicamp, Howard suffered a knee injury and was placed on the physically unable to perform list after it was discovered he would require surgery. Howard underwent arthroscopy surgery and was unable to physically participate in training camp. Although he missed the first three preseason games, head coach Adam Gase elected to name Howard the second starting cornerback, alongside veteran Byron Maxwell, to begin the regular season.

He started the Miami Dolphins' season-opener at the Seattle Seahawks and recorded a season-high 11 combined tackles during their 12–10 loss. On October 6, 2016, Howard suffered another knee injury during practice. The meniscus injury required surgery and he missed the next nine games (Weeks 5–14). On December 17, 2016, Howard appeared in his first game since his knee injury and collected three solo tackles and had a season-high three pass deflections during a 34–13 victory at the New York Jets. The Miami Dolphins finished their first season under head coach Adam Gase second in the AFC East with a 10–6 record. On January 8, 2017, Howard started his first career playoff game and recorded five combined tackles, broke up two passes, and made his first career interception off of a pass attempt by Ben Roethlisberger as the Dolphins were defeated by the Pittsburgh Steelers in the AFC Wild Card Round.

2017
Howard entered training camp in 2017, slated as the Miami Dolphins' No. 1 cornerback. He was named the starting cornerback to start the regular season, along with Byron Maxwell. Bobby McCain and Alterraun Verner were named the backup cornerbacks.

Howard started the Miami Dolphins' season-opener at the Los Angeles Chargers and recorded a season-high seven combined tackles during their 19–17 victory. In Week 13, Howard recorded a solo tackle, a season-high five pass breakups, two interceptions, and returned one for a touchdown during the Dolphins' 35–9 win against the Denver Broncos. During the second quarter, Howard intercepted a pass by Trevor Siemian and returned it for a 30-yard touchdown to mark the first score of his career. The following week, he deflected three passes and intercepted New England Patriots' quarterback Tom Brady twice during their 27–20 win on Monday Night Football. He earned AFC Defensive Player of the Week honors for his performance against the Patriots. On December 17, 2017, Howard collected four solo tackles and made his first career sack on Tyrod Taylor, as the Dolphins were defeated by the Buffalo Bills 24–16. Howard finished  with 48 combined tackles (42 solo), 13 pass deflections, four interceptions, and a sack in 16 games and 16 starts.

2018
During the New York Jets home opener in Week 2, Xavien Howard got his first interception of the season. One week later, Howard recorded his third career game with two interceptions on Derek Carr in the 28–20 victory over the Oakland Raiders. Howard also intercepted Colts' quarterback Andrew Luck twice in a span of 14 seconds during the Dolphins' loss on the road against the Indianapolis Colts. In Week 13 of the 2018 season, Howard injured his knee after intercepting Bills' quarterback Josh Allen for the second time that afternoon. He went on to miss the final four games of the regular season. Howard ended the 2018 season leading the league interceptions with Chicago corner Kyle Fuller and Atlanta safety Damontae Kazee with seven. Howard was named to his first Pro Bowl and first second-team All-Pro.

2019
On May 9, 2019, Howard signed a five-year, $76.5 million contract extension with the Dolphins with $46 million guaranteed, making him the highest-paid cornerback in the league. In week 3 against the Dallas Cowboys, Howard was ejected after slapping wide receiver Cedrick Wilson Jr. on the facemask. Prior to being ejected, Howard recorded two tackles in the 31–6 loss. Howard was forced to miss the next three games due to a knee injury. He made his return in Week 8 against the Pittsburgh Steelers. In the game, Howard recorded an interception off a pass from Mason Rudolph that was intended for JuJu Smith-Schuster before reinjuring his knee. Without Howard, the Dolphins lost 27–14. He was placed on injured reserve on October 29, 2019 with a knee injury.

2020
Howard was placed on the active/physically unable to perform list by the Dolphins at the start of training camp on July 28, 2020. He was moved to the reserve/COVID-19 list by the team on August 11, 2020. He was activated from both lists on August 27, 2020.

In Week 3 against the Jacksonville Jaguars on Thursday Night Football, Howard recorded his first interception of the season during the 31–13 win.
In Week 4 against the Seattle Seahawks, Howard recorded his second interception of the season off a pass thrown by Russell Wilson during the 31–23 loss. Howard’s second interception surpassed his previous season’s interception total.
In Week 6 against the New York Jets, Howard recorded an interception off a pass thrown by Joe Flacco during the 24–0 win. This was Howard's fourth game in a row with an interception. In Week 13 against the Cincinnati Bengals, Howard was ejected after he and Tyler Boyd were involved in an altercation. Before Howard was ejected, he recorded his eighth interception of the season, a career high. 
In Week 14 against the Kansas City Chiefs, Howard recorded a one handed interception off a pass thrown by Patrick Mahomes during the 33–27 loss.
In Week 17 against the Buffalo Bills, Howard recorded his league leading 10th interception of the season off a pass thrown by Matt Barkley during the 56–26 loss. On January 8, 2021, Howard was named as a 1st-team All-Pro, the first time he had earned that honor (he had been a 2nd-team All-Pro in 2018).

2021
In July 2021, Howard announced that he had requested a trade from the Dolphins due to feeling undervalued and underpaid, also stating "I am just here so I don't get fined" in regards to him reporting to training camp. On August 8, the Dolphins reworked Howard's contract that would make him the highest-paid cornerback of 2021 with incentives and bonuses.

In Week 10, had five tackles, a forced fumble, and a 49-yard fumble recovery touchdown in a 22-10 win over the Ravens, earning AFC Defensive Player of the Week.

2022
On April 1, 2022, Howard signed a new five-year contract with $50.691 million in new money.

NFL career statistics

Regular season

References

External links
Baylor Bears bio
Miami Dolphins bio

1993 births
American football cornerbacks
Baylor Bears football players
Living people
Miami Dolphins players
Players of American football from Houston
American Conference Pro Bowl players